These are the results of the 2005 United Kingdom general election in Wales. The election was held on 5 May 2005 and all 40 seats in Wales were contested.

Results
Below is a table summarising the results of the 2005 general election in Wales.

Outcome and changes

The election saw Labour lose ground in Wales although it still won 29 of Wales' 40 constituencies and 42.7% of the vote. In what the BBC described as a "sensational defeat" Labour lost Blaenau Gwent, its "safest seat in Wales" to Independent Peter Law, a member of the Welsh Assembly who had left Labour to contest the election following a dispute about the use of an all-women shortlist in the selection of Labour's candidate.

Plaid Cymru, also fell back losing Ceredigion (to the Liberal Democrats) and failing to regain Ynys Môn which they had narrowly lost to Labour in 2001. This followed on from what the BBC described as "a poor performance" by Plaid Cymru at the 2003 National Assembly for Wales election, when it was reduced from 17 seats to 12.  Elfyn Llwyd, Plaid Cymru's parliamentary leader who was re-elected as MP for Meirionnydd Nant Conwy, said the result was "extremely disappointing". However he also stated that  while the result was "a set back...but it's not half as bad as the media speculation would suggest", noting he and Plaid's two other MPs increased their majorities, and that "If 1,400 votes had gone the other way, we would have won Ynys Mon and held Ceredigion."

The Conservatives made three gains from Labour (Clwyd West, Preseli Pembrokeshire and Monmouth, the first time there had been Conservative MPs from Welsh constituencies since the party had been wiped out in Wales in the 1997 election. The Shadow Secretary of State for Wales, Bill Wiggin, said after the result "Never again will Wales be a Conservative-free zone". However, the Conservatives failed to win two other target Labour-held seats, Vale of Glamorgan and Cardiff North, which the BBC described as "disappointments" for them, and Wiggin admitted that he would have liked the Party to win more seats in Wales.

The Liberal Democrats gained two seats (taking Cardiff Central from Labour in addition to their gain of Ceredigion, doubling their Welsh total to four seats. Lembit Öpik, the Welsh Liberal Democrats leader, described this as a "fantastic night" for his party in Wales, and called their gaining of Ceredigion the "result of the night". He also add that by having the second highest number of Welsh MPs the Welsh Liberal Democrats were now "the official opposition" to Labour at Westminster.

See also
 2005 United Kingdom general election in England
 2005 United Kingdom general election in Northern Ireland
 2005 United Kingdom general election in Scotland

References

Wales
2005 in Wales
2000s elections in Wales
2005